Mark Turnham Elvins OFMCap (26 November 1939 – 1 May 2014) was Warden of Greyfriars, Oxford, until its closure in 2008.

Life
Mark Turnham Elvins was born on 26 November 1939 in Whitstable, the son of an Anglican priest who had been rector of St Mary in the Castle, Dover.

Elvins was educated at Dover College, St Stephen's House, Oxford, Beda College, Pontifical Gregorian University, and Heythrop College, where he earned his Master of Arts (MA) degree from the University of London. He received a Graduate Diploma in Spirituality at Milltown Institute, Dublin.

At the beginning of his career, he passed into the Royal Military Academy Sandhurst but opted for the Territorial Army, serving with the Honourable Artillery Company and eventually reaching the rank of captain in the Royal Army Chaplains' Department. In civilian life he began by working as a gallery manager at St James's Gallery, Jermyn Street, London, and as assistant editor of Debrett's Peerage. Following his theological studies at St Stephen's House, Oxford, he was ordained an Anglican deacon.

On 24 December 1968 he was received into the Roman Catholic Church. He was ordained a priest in Arundel on Easter Sunday 1973  and was assistant curate at Arundel Cathedral and Chantry priest to the Duke of Norfolk from 1973 to 1979. From 1980 until 1990 he served at St Mary Magdalene's parish church in Brighton, holding additionally the post of Chaplain to the Master of the Worshipful Company of Scriveners of the City of London. From 1990 until 1993 he was parish priest of Henfield. In 1999, he was professed in the Order of Friars Minor Capuchin and was a Provincial Definitor from 2006 to 11. During the academic years 2005–2007 he was the Roman Catholic chaplain to the University of Central Lancashire. Following the retirement of Nicholas Richardson in 2007, Elvins was appointed warden of Greyfriars, Oxford, and upon the dissolution of the permanent private hall was appointed guardian of the friary (Greyfriars) from 2008 to 2011.

Throughout his life Elvins was particularly concerned for the homeless and was the founder of Simon House in Oxford (1967), the St Thomas Fund for the Homeless in Brighton (1980) and Becket Homes in Canterbury (1997), as well as being a co-founder of the Thomas More Legal Centre. In 2011, he founded Regina Palestinae (Our Lady of Palestine), a charity for the support of poor families in Palestine.

In 1982, Elvins was appointed an Ecclesiastical Knight of Grace of the Sacred Military Constantinian Order of Saint George and chaplain and council member of the British and Irish delegation of the order.

In 2003, the order awarded him the Gold Benemerenti Medal. He was also a chaplain of Magistral Grace of the Sovereign Military Hospitaller Order of Saint John of Jerusalem, of Rhodes, and of Malta. In 2007, he led a wreath-laying ceremony in honour of Henry Benedict Stuart at the Royal Hospital Chelsea in London.

The Heraldry Society holds an annual Mark Elvins Lecture. On 16 April 2008, the Rt Revd Dom Geoffrey Scott OSB, Abbot of Douai, spoke on "The heraldry of James II and his cult".

Death
Elvins died on 1 May 2014, aged 74, from cancer.

Publications

 Mark Turnham Elvins (Mark of Whitstable), A Eucharistic vision and the spirituality of St Francis of Assisi (Leominster: Gracewing, 2007)
M.T. Elvins (Mark of Whitstable), Gospel chivalry: Franciscan Romanticism (Leominster: Gracewing, 2006)
M.T. Elvins, Catholic trivia: our forgotten heritage, illustrated by John Ryan (Leominster: Gracewing, 2002; previously published London: HarperCollins Religious, 1992)
M.T. Elvins, Our Lady and the Ecumenical movement in the light of her maternal patronage: a paper given to members of the Canterbury branch of the Society on 27 September 1997 (Wallington: Ecumenical Society of the Blessed Virgin Mary, 2000)
M.T. Elvins, St. Thomas Becket and the homeless (London: Buckland, 1994)
M.T. Elvins, "St." Thomas of Dover: monk and martyr (London: Buckland, 1994)
M.T. Elvins, Towards a people's liturgy: the importance of language (Leominster: Gracewing, 1994)
M.T. Elvins, Cardinals and heraldry, illustrated by Anselm Baker, foreword by the Archbishop of Birmingham (Maurice Noël Léon Couve de Murville), preface by John Brooke-Little (Norroy and Ulster King of Arms) (London: Buckland Publications, 1988)
M.T. Elvins and Teresa Searle, Drugs: how the Church can help (Great Wakering: McCrimmons, 1987)
M.T. Elvins, The Church's response to the homeless (Great Wakering: Mayhew McCrimmon, 1985)
M.T. Elvins, Arundel Priory, 1380–1980: the College of the Holy Trinity (London: Phillimore, 1981)
M.T. Elvins, Bayham Abbey 1182–1982: its founder and his family (Hove: Chichester Diocesan Fund and Board of Finance, 1981)
M.T. Elvins, 'Oxford University Heraldry Society', The Coat of Arms NS 4.119 (1981)
M.T. Elvins, Old Catholic England (London: Catholic Truth Society, 1978)

References

External links
Biography, marymagdalen.blogspot.com. Retrieved 12 July 2014 
Biographies of Council Members of the Sacred Military Constantinian Order of Saint George, constantinian.org.uk. Retrieved 12 July 2014
'Oration by the Vice-Chancellor', Oxford University Gazette supplement (3) to no. 4818, 3 October 2007, pg. 100
M.T. Elvins, "St Francis, Creation and Original Innocence", The Ark 187 (Spring 2001). Retrieved 12 July 2014 
 M.T. Elvins, "England – The Dowry of Mary: The Origin of the Title 'Dowry of Mary' and The Shrines of our Lady at Westminster", Papers on Proposed 5th Marian Dogma. Retrieved 12 July 2014.
Mark Turnham Elvins, 'Some Reflections on Our Lady and The Ecumenical Movement in the Light of Her Maternal Patronage', Papers on Proposed 5th Marian Dogma
Heraldry Society Annual Programme 2007/2008, theheraldrysociety.com. Retrieved 12 July 2014
Profile, Scuola di Spiritualita website. Retrieved 12 July 2014 
Royal Hospital Chelsea Commemoration of the Bicententary of the death of Henry Benedict Stuart (includes several photographs of Mark Turnham Elvins)

 

1939 births
2014 deaths
Alumni of University of London Worldwide
Alumni of the University of London
Alumni of Heythrop College
Alumni of St Stephen's House, Oxford
Alumni of Milltown Institute of Theology and Philosophy
People educated at Dover College
Pontifical Gregorian University alumni
Roman Catholic writers
British theologians
20th-century English theologians
20th-century English Roman Catholic priests
21st-century English Roman Catholic priests
Capuchins
Wardens of Greyfriars, Oxford
Graduates of the Royal Military Academy Sandhurst
Royal Army Chaplains' Department officers
Anglican priest converts to Roman Catholicism
20th-century English Anglican priests
Place of death missing
People from Whitstable
Military personnel from Kent
People from Henfield